The blue anole (Anolis gorgonae) falls into the genus Dactyloa, which are all highly arboreal, but differ in size, coloration, and perch preferences. The blue anole specifically occupies higher perches. It is also a small species of dactyloid lizard. It is near-threatened and found only on the island of Gorgona, in the Colombian Pacific.

Description

Both sexes of this anole are overall pure blue, which is very rare in lizards. The male's dewlap is pure white. At least some individuals have a series of darker mottled spots on the head and neck. The blue anole, is unique among all anoles because of their bright blue color, their size; smaller, and are slimmer than the other Dactyloa. The blue anole is mostly found within an inhabited area on the island, where they were seen to be in open branches of the trees. They also like to be on the trunks of trees.

Conservation status
Due to the isolated environment and elusive nature of A. gorgonae, which mostly lives in rainforest high off the ground, it has been difficult to accurately estimate its population. They commonly fall prey to the introduced western basilisk lizards and may also fall prey to introduced rats, cats and capuchin monkeys. The largest amount of damage to their habitat occurred when a prison was built in the 1950s, but since 1984 the entire island has been a protected national park. It has been proposed that some individuals could be captured for a captive breeding program.

See also
List of Anolis lizards
Lygodactylus williamsi, a similar threatened lizard

References

External links
 World's only pure blue lizard at risk of extinction
 Blue Anolis and Basilisk

Anoles
Reptiles of Colombia
Endemic fauna of Colombia
Reptiles described in 1905
Taxa named by Thomas Barbour